Karl Puth (1891–1955) was a German cinematographer.

Selected filmography
 The Green Manuela (1923)
 The Countess of Paris (1923)
 In the Name of the King (1924)
 Orient Express (1927)
 Attorney for the Heart (1927)
 The Master of Nuremberg (1927)
 Angst (1928)
 Kitty (1929)
 A Mother's Love (1929)
 White Cargo (1929)
 Everybody Wins (1930)
 My Wife, the Impostor (1931)
 The True Jacob (1931)
 Headfirst into Happiness (1931)
 I'll Stay with You (1931)
 The Old Scoundrel (1932)
 The Company's in Love (1932)
 The Tsarevich (1933)
 The Star of Valencia (1933)
 And the Plains Are Gleaming (1933)
 The Sporck Battalion (1934)
 Mother and Child (1934)
 The Old and the Young King (1935)
 The Valley of Love (1935)
 City of Anatol (1936)
 Augustus the Strong (1936)
 Wells in Flames (1937)
 The Impossible Mister Pitt (1938)
 The Night of Decision (1938)
 The Song of Aixa (1939)
 A Woman Like You (1939)
 The Merciful Lie (1939)
 Der Herr im Haus (1940)
 Passion (1940)
 Charivan (1941)
 Two Happy People (1943)
 Elephant Fury (1953)

Bibliography
 Bergfelder, Tim & Harris, Sue & Street, Sarah. Film Architecture and the Transnational Imagination: Set Design in 1930s European Cinema. Amsterdam University Press, 2007.

External links

1891 births
1955 deaths
German cinematographers
Film people from Berlin